California's 46th State Assembly district is one of 80 California State Assembly districts. It is currently represented by Democrat Adrin Nazarian of North Hollywood.

District profile 
The district encompasses the central and southeastern San Fernando Valley. This ethnically diverse district is an important gateway between the valley and the rest of Los Angeles.

Los Angeles County – 4.7%
 Los Angeles – 12.2%
 Hollywood Hills – partial
 Lake Balboa
 North Hills
 North Hollywood – partial
 Panorama City
 Sherman Oaks
 Studio City
 Toluca Lake
 Valley Glen
 Valley Village
 Van Nuys
 Universal City

Election results from statewide races

List of Assembly Members 
Due to redistricting, the 46th district has been moved around different parts of the state. The current iteration resulted from the 2011 redistricting by the California Citizens Redistricting Commission.

Election results 1992 - present

2020

2018

2016

2014

2012

2010

2008

2006

2004

2002

2000

1998

1996

1994

1992

See also 
 California State Assembly
 California State Assembly districts
 Districts in California

References

External links 
 District map from the California Citizens Redistricting Commission

46
Government of Los Angeles
Government of Los Angeles County, California
San Fernando Valley
Panorama City, Los Angeles
Sherman Oaks, Los Angeles
Studio City, Los Angeles
Toluca Lake, Los Angeles
Van Nuys, Los Angeles
Universal City, California